The Lebu (Lebou, Lébou) are an ethnic group of Senegal, West Africa, living on the peninsula of Cap-Vert. The Lebu are primarily a fishing community, but they have a substantial business in construction supplies and real estate. They speak Lebu Wolof, which is closely related to Wolof proper but is not intelligible with it. Their political and spiritual capital is at Layene, situated in the Yoff neighborhood of northern Dakar. They have a religious sect and theocracy, the Layene, headquartered there. 

The traditional date of the founding of Yoff is 1430. Although they were conquered by the Kingdoms of Jolof (Diolof) and Cayor, and later the French in the 19th century, and were incorporated into modern Senegal, since 1815 they have had a special legal autonomy as a special kind of "theocratic republic".

Lebu society emphasizes piety and respect for elders. Lebu families include not only living people but also associated ancestral spirits.  The Lebu are noted for their public exorcism dances and rituals, often attended by tourists. Most Lebu are adherents of Islam.

In addition to Yoff, other Lebu centres are nearby Ouakam, Cambérène and Ngor.

References

Related people
 Serer people
 Wolof people

Further reading
  Armand-Pierre Angrand, Les Lébous de la presqu'île du Cap-vert. Essai sur leur histoire et leurs coutumes, Dakar, E. Gensul, 1946, 143 p.
  Birahim Ba, La société lébu. La formation d’un peuple. La naissance d’un État, Dakar, Université de Dakar, 1972, 206 p. (Mémoire de maîtrise)
  Georges Balandier et Pierre Mercier, Particularisme et évolution : les pêcheurs Lébou (Sénégal), Saint-Louis, Sénégal, Centre IFAN-Sénégal, 1952, 216p.
  Adama Baytir Diop, La prise de position de la collectivité lebu en faveur du “oui” lors du référendum de 1958. Essai d’interprétation, Dakar, Université de Dakar, 1985, 51 p. (Diplôme d’études approfondies)
  Adama Baytir Diop, La communauté lebu face aux développement de la politique coloniale : la question des terrains de Dakar (1887-1958), Dakar, Université Cheikh Anta Diop, 1995, 277 p. (thesis)
  Cécile Laborde, La confrérie layenne et les Lébous du Sénégal : Islam et culture traditionnelle en Afrique, Bordeaux, Institut d'Etudes Politiques de Bordeaux, Université Montesquieu, 1995 
  Colette Le Cour Grandmaison, Rôles traditionnels féminins et urbanisation. Lébou et wolof de Dakar, Paris, EPHE, 1970, 4+310+23 p. (Thèse de 3e cycle, publiée en 1972 sous le titre Femmes dakaroises: rôles traditionnels féminins et urbanisation, Abidjan, Annales de l’Université d’Abidjan, 249 p.)
  M. Mbodji, "Tiané, une jeune fille en quête d'initiation: rêver chez les Wolof-Lébou, ou comment communiquer avec les ancêtres?", dans Psychopathologie africaine, 1998–1999, vol. 29, n° 1, p. 7-21
  Mariama Ndoye Mbengue, Introduction à la littérature orale léboue. Analyse ethno-sociologique et expression littéraire, Dakar, Université de Dakar, 1983, 378 p. (Thesis)
  Médoune Paye, La collectivité lebu de Dakar : organisation, rôle politique dans les élections municipales de 1925 à 1934, Dakar, Université Cheikh Anta Diop, 2001, 118 p. (Master's thesis)
  Ousmane Silla, Croyances et cultes syncrétiques des Lébous du Sénégal, Paris, EPHE, 1967, 517 p. (Thèse de 3e cycle)
  Assane Sylla, Le Peuple Lébou de la presqu'île du Cap-Vert, Dakar, Les Nouvelles Éditions africaines du Sénégal, 1992, 135 p.
  Tamsir Sylla, Introduction à un thème négligé : révoltes et résistances en milieu lebou au XIXe siècle. Approche  critique des sources, Dakar, Université Cheikh Anta Diop, 1990, 36 p. (Mémoire de DEA)
  Ibrahima Thiam, Ousmane Diop Coumba Pathé, personnalité politique lebu : 1867-1958, Dakar, Université de Dakar, 1987, 46 p. (Diplôme d’Études Approfondies)
  Guy Thilmans, "Étude de quelques crânes lébou (Sénégal)", Bulletin de l'IFAN, 1968, t. 30, série B, 4, p. 1291-1297

 
Muslim communities in Africa
Ethnic groups in Senegal
1430 establishments
15th-century establishments in Africa
1815 establishments in Africa